Colasposoma aurichalcicum is a species of leaf beetles. It is distributed in Gabon, the Democratic Republic of the Congo and Ethiopia. It was described by the American entomologist James Thomson in 1858.

References

aurichalcicum
Beetles of the Democratic Republic of the Congo
Insects of Gabon
Insects of Ethiopia
Beetles described in 1858